Everybody Wants is the debut studio album from English rock band The Struts. It was first released on 28 July 2014 and reached  52  on the United Kingdom album charts.

Re-issue

After touring  North America in the latter half of 2015 promoting their Have You Heard EP, The Struts announced that they would be releasing their U.S. debut, a re-release of their original album with new tracks, to be released on FreeSolo and Interscope Records.

Through an Instagram post by Luke Spiller and a tweeted by Gethin Davies, it was confirmed that this release of Everybody Wants will feature new tracks, plus remastered or rerecordings of most of the songs off the original 2014 release. It ended up being five new tracks ("Mary Go Round," "The Ol' Switcheroo," "Young Stars," "These Times are Changing" and "Only Just a Call Away"), three from the original release were dropped ("My Machine," "You & I" and "Let's Make This Happen Tonight") and one, "She Makes Me Feel," was retitled to "She Makes Me Feel Like." The songs "Roll Up", "Could Have Been Me", "Kiss This", "Put Your Money On Me" and "She Makes Me Feel" were re-recorded. While keeping the original album's title, the reissue has different cover art.

Track listing

Charts

References

2014 debut albums
The Struts albums
Glam rock albums by British artists
Virgin EMI Records albums
Interscope Records albums